Liston Sprauve (May 17, 1944 – August 29, 2018) was a weightlifter who represents the United States Virgin Islands. He competed in the men's heavyweight event at the 1968 Summer Olympics.

References

External links
 

1944 births
2018 deaths
United States Virgin Islands male weightlifters
Olympic weightlifters of the United States Virgin Islands
Weightlifters at the 1968 Summer Olympics
Place of birth missing